Chronoswiss is a Swiss watch manufacturer based in Lucerne. The company was founded by Gerd R. Lang in 1983 to make mechanical timepieces. Prior to founding Chronoswiss, Lang had gained significant experience in manufacturing movements for other major brands. The watches use bought-in movements.  Chronoswiss produces about 7,000 watches per year. All watches are hand-finished. While many of the movements used in Chronoswiss watches are based on the Enicar 165 movement, the Chronoswiss versions feature significant improvements, both technical and aesthetic.

As a brand valued mostly by collectors, Chronoswiss watches generally sell at the low end of their price range at auctions.

In 2012, Swiss entrepreneur Oliver Ebstein, and his wife Eva bought and took over the management of Chronoswiss. The headquarters are located at Lucerne, Switzerland, and open to visitors.

References

Manufacturing companies of Switzerland
Watch brands
Watch manufacturing companies of Switzerland
Manufacturing companies established in 1983